Bojri is a Village Council in Battagram District of Khyber-Pakhtunkhwa.

References

Union councils of Battagram District
Populated places in Battagram District